Nicholas Berry may refer to:
Nic Berry (born 1984), Australian rugby union player
Nick Berry (born 1963), British actor and singer
Nicholas Berry (Daily Mail), corporate director Daily Mail and General Trust